The 1910 Rhode Island State Rams football team was an American football team that represented Rhode Island State College (later renamed the University of Rhode Island) as an independent during the 1910 college football season. In its second year under head coach George Cobb, the team compiled a 5–1–1 record.

Schedule

References

Rhode Island State
Rhode Island Rams football seasons
Rhode Island State Rams football